Hkomi is a village in the eastern part of Homalin Township, Hkamti District, in the Sagaing Region of northwestern Burma. It is located near the east of Mansein.

References

External links
Maplandia World Gazetteer

Populated places in Hkamti District
Homalin Township